Barbara Ann Caulfield (December 2, 1947 – November 9, 2010) was a United States district judge of the United States District Court for the Northern District of California.

Education and career

Born in Oak Park, Illinois, Caulfield  received a Bachelor of Science degree from Northwestern University in 1969 and a Juris Doctor from Northwestern University School of Law in 1972. She was a researcher and attorney of the Chicago Law Enforcement Study Group, Northwestern University Center for Urban Affairs from 1972 to 1973, and a supervising attorney of Northwestern University School Law Legal Aid Clinic from 1973 to 1974. She was a professor of law at the University of Oregon Law School from 1974 to 1978. She was a professor of law, University of California, San Francisco, Hastings College of the Law from 1978 to 1983, serving as an academic dean from 1980 to 1981. She was in private practice in San Francisco, California from 1983 to 1991, serving as senior counsel to Pacific Bell from 1990 to 1991. She also began as a lecturer in law in the Stanford Law School in 1988.

Federal judicial service

On June 27, 1991, Caulfield was nominated by President George H. W. Bush to a seat on the United States District Court for the Northern District of California vacated by Judge William Schwarzer. She was confirmed by the United States Senate on October 31, 1991, and received her commission on November 5, 1991. Caulfield served in that capacity until her resignation from the bench on September 16, 1994.

Later life

Caulfield thereafter returned to private practice in San Francisco, and continued to lecture at Stanford until her death on November 9, 2010.

References

Sources
 

1947 births
2010 deaths
Judges of the United States District Court for the Northern District of California
United States district court judges appointed by George H. W. Bush
20th-century American judges
Northwestern University Pritzker School of Law alumni
University of Oregon faculty
University of California, Hastings faculty
Stanford Law School faculty
American women legal scholars
20th-century American women judges